Excursion is defined as how far the cone of a speaker linearly travels from its resting position. Lower frequency drivers or subwoofers are designed to move more air and have more excursion than those of higher frequency. If a speaker is pushed beyond its limits, overexcursion, or "bottoming out," can occur as the voice coil either slips out of the magnetic gap or hits the bottom of it. 

Often, large speakers such as those used in clubs and in professional audio actually allow little cone excursion and/or they have fairly stiff surrounds that do not allow them to fluctuate greatly without high power. This is because they would otherwise overdrive and have a much shorter lifetime because it doesn't take much power at very low frequencies to cause even a large and "powerful" loudspeaker to overfluctuate.

Extremes
The MTX Jackhammer, a 22-inch subwoofer made by MTX Audio, is capable of 2.5 inches of linear cone excursion, one way. That is a total range of 5 inches, which is potentially hazardous.

The Thunder 1000000, the record holder for the largest subwoofer ever made, with a diameter of 60 inches, is capable of 6 inches of peak to peak cone excursion.

See also
Power handling

Loudspeaker technology